A clothes line is an apparatus  on which laundry is hung to dry, usually outdoors.

Clothes line or clothesline may  also refer to:

Clothesline, a set of moves in professional wrestling
 Clothes-Line, an early television documentary on fashion history (1937)

≠≠See also ==
The Clothesline Project